The Jewish Social Democratic Party "Poale Zion", later renamed Jewish Socialist Workers Party Poale Zion in German Austria (Jüdische sozialistische Arbeiterpartei Poale Zion in Deutschösterreich) in the fall of 1921 and Jewish Communist Party of Austria (Jüdische Kommunistische Partei Oesterreichs), was a political party in Austria. The party published Freie Tribune 1919–1921. The party was part of the international Jewish Communist Union (Poalei Zion), the left wing of the Labour Zionist Poale Zion movement.

References 

Jewish political parties
Jewish communist movements
Jewish Austrian history
Defunct political parties in Austria
Communist parties in Austria
Zionism in Austria
Political parties of minorities
Poale Zion